Forbidden Zone is a 1982 musical comedy film.

Forbidden Zone may also refer to:

 Forbidden Zone (France), the World War II Zone Interdite in northern France
 Forbidden Zone (soundtrack), a soundtrack album from the film
 Forbidden Zone (Planet of the Apes), an off-limits area in the Planet of the Apes film franchise
 Forbidden Zone Magazine, a publication edited by Horatio Weisfeld
 "Forbidden Zone", a song by Bedrock
 "The Forbidden Zone", a song by Misfits from Famous Monsters
 "The Forbidden Zone", a novel by Whitley Strieber

See also 
 Chernobyl Exclusion Zone, an officially designated exclusion area around the site of the Chernobyl nuclear reactor disaster
 Zone interdite, two distinct territories established in German-occupied France during World War II
 Exclusion zone
 Demilitarized zone
 Antics in the Forbidden Zone, a compilation album by Adam Ant